A pulmonary hematoma is a collection of blood within the tissue of the lung.  It may result when a pulmonary laceration fills with blood.  A lung laceration filled with air is called a pneumatocele.  In some cases, both pneumatoceles and hematomas exist in the same injured lung.  Pulmonary hematomas take longer to heal than simple pneumatoceles and commonly leave the lungs scarred.  A pulmonary contusion is another cause of bleeding within the lung tissue, but these result from microhemorrhages, multiple small bleeds, and the bleeding is not a discrete mass but rather occurs within the lung tissue.  An indication of more severe damage to the lung than pulmonary contusion, a hematoma also takes longer to clear. Unlike contusions, hematomas do not usually interfere with gas exchange in the lung, but they do increase the risk of infection and abscess formation.

References

Chest trauma
Lung disorders